Bjørnstadvatnet is a lake in Hammerfest Municipality in Troms og Finnmark county, Norway. The lake has a dam on the northern end of the lake, and it is regulated for hydroelectric power.

See also
List of lakes in Norway

References

Kvalsund
Reservoirs in Norway
Lakes of Troms og Finnmark